"The Frog Prince" is a song performed and composed by English alternative rock band Keane, released as the closing track on their second album, Under the Iron Sea. The song was composed in 2004 and first mentioned by Tim Rice-Oxley on the Strangers DVD. A demo version also features Rice-Oxley singing on the lead vocals.

Meaning
Rice-Oxley explains the song on the band's 6th podcast:

It has been suggested that the person described above is Razorlight's frontman, Johnny Borrell. On 18th October 2006, when Keane were playing at the Apollo Manchester, Tom Chaplin dedicated the song to Oasis member Liam Gallagher.

Musical structure 
Regarded by Rice-Oxley himself as a "corny" song, it follows a medieval-fairytale soft progression, with an identic piano playing of that of "This Is the Last Time".  Sixteen beats drumming are introduced with 10 seconds of playback.  Rice-Oxley often creates an impromptu during live performances with the entry of the chorus at 1:31, that would lead piano going quicker and stronger, leaving the electric in the background sound.  Bridge requires Rice-Oxley's vocals and distorted piano to complete, followed by the last verse which lies before the magical outro, created with the Yamaha CP60 Chaplin plays during gigs, a succession of F-G-F-G-A-Bb-G-F.  The song fades with the normal piano and the musicbox-fairytale riff fading out.

External links
Official website

2006 songs
Keane (band) songs
Songs written by Tim Rice-Oxley
Songs written by Tom Chaplin
Songs written by Richard Hughes (musician)
Diss tracks
Songs about musicians